The Central District of Rudan County is a district (bakhsh) in Rudan County, Hormozgan Province, Iran. At the 2006 census, its population was 52,816, in 11,112 families.  The District has one city: Rudan. The District has three rural districts (dehestan): Abnama Rural District, Faryab Rural District, and Rahdar Rural District.

References 

Districts of Hormozgan Province
Rudan County